Alvaro Martins (born 30 August 1901, date of death unknown) was a Brazilian footballer. He played in four matches for the Brazil national football team in 1919 and 1920. He was also part of Brazil's squad for the 1919 South American Championship.

References

External links
 

1901 births
Year of death missing
Brazilian footballers
Brazil international footballers
Place of birth missing
Association football midfielders
São Cristóvão de Futebol e Regatas players
America Football Club (Rio de Janeiro) players